A lineage is a unilineal descent group that can demonstrate their common descent from a known apical ancestor. Unilineal lineages can be matrilineal or patrilineal, depending on whether they are traced through mothers or fathers, respectively. Whether matrilineal or patrilineal descent is considered most significant differs from culture to culture.

Matrilineal descent is associated with certain characteristics such as matriarchy, matrilocality and consanguinity. However a system can be matrilineal without possessing such characteristics.

References

Further reading
 

Kinship and descent